Benedetto Accolti the younger (29 October 1497 – 21 September 1549) was an Italian cardinal.  He was born in Florence, Italy, the son of Michele Accolti, patrician of Arezzo, and Lucrezia Alamanni.  He died in Florence of an apoplexy. He was nephew of  Cardinal Pietro Accolti and was called "Il Giovane" or the  Cardinal of Ravenna.

Early life
He studied in the universities of Florence and Pisa.Benedetto Accolti started his ecclesiastical career in the Roman Curia, following the steps of his uncle.

Episcopate
He was promoted bishop of Cadiz on 24 July 1521, before reaching canonical age of 27, so he was named administrator after his uncle. Then he was transferred to Cremona on 16 March 1523 again after his uncle and then named Secretary of Pope Clement VII the same year.

Cardinalate
He was created cardinal priest in the consistory of 3 May 1527 with the title of Sant'Eusebio, again after his uncle. On 17 August 1524 he was promoted to the metropolitan see of Ravenna after his uncle. He was named administrator of Diocese of Bovino and then of the Diocese of Policastro until 1535. In addition, James V of Scotland appointed him Cardinal-Protector of Scottish affairs at Rome, dealing with church appointments and negotiations for the King's marriage. His uncle, the Cardinal of Ancona, had performed this role since the regency of the Duke of Albany.

He participated in the Conclave in 1534. The new Pope Paul III deprived him of his cardinalate on 27 August 1534, and imprisoned him in the Castel Sant'Angelo, accusing him  of misspending 19,000 ducats for the expedition against the Turks. The next year he paid a large sum of money and was restored to the cardinalate under some conditions.

He wrote some works in Latin, including poetry. At the request of the later Pope, he wrote a treatise to assert the right of the pope to the Kingdom of Naples.He died in Florence on 21 September 1549 in Florence and was buried in the church of S. Lorenzo, Florence.

References

External links

1497 births
1549 deaths
Clergy from Florence
Archbishops of Ravenna
16th-century Italian Roman Catholic archbishops
16th-century Italian cardinals
16th-century people of the Republic of Florence